Thomas Arthur Slater (25 February 1908 – 1976) was an English footballer.

Career
Slater played for Easington Colliery, Murton and Clapton Orient before joining Port Vale in June 1930. He kept a clean sheet on his debut; a 2–0 win over Swansea Town on 11 October 1930 at The Old Recreation Ground, and was the number one keeper until he lost this position to previous favourite Ben Davies in January 1931. He played 14 Second Division games in 1930–31 and six games in 1931–32. He transferred to Watford in August 1932, but was replaced by new signing Jim McLaren after struggling with injuries and later moved on to Vauxhall Motors.

Career statistics
Source:

References

1908 births
1976 deaths
Sportspeople from Chester-le-Street
Footballers from County Durham
English footballers
Association football goalkeepers
Easington Colliery A.F.C. players
Murton A.F.C. players
Leyton Orient F.C. players
Port Vale F.C. players
Watford F.C. players
Vauxhall Motors F.C. players
English Football League players